According to the Book of Mormon, Jarom was a Nephite prophet, the son of the prophet Enos, who lived from about 420 BC to about 361 BC.  Jarom is thought to have authored the Book of Jarom, which comprises 15 verses in the Book of Mormon.

Family

Writings
Jarom relates that he received "revelations" and prophesied, and that there were many wars between the two Book of Mormon peoples the Nephites and the Lamanites. Before his death, record keeping was handed over to his son Omni.

Possible origin of the name 
Hugh Nibley states that "Jarom" means "to be prosperous, to be happy" in Aramaic, and states:

"Now we come to Jarom. His name is interesting. Notice, these names are not in Hebrew... Jarom means 'to prosper or to get a good share of something.'. It means 'to support one's family properly.' It also means 'to have good luck in business' or 'finding something of value'. It can also mean 'to grasp or snatch something' or 'to be a crook'. That's the way these words do; one meaning leading to the next. They are very rich, but the basic meaning of Jarom is 'to be prosperous, to be happy'."

See also
 Plates of Nephi: Caretakers

References

Book of Mormon prophets